Wojciech Brydziński (28 January 1877 in Ivano-Frankivsk – 4 May 1966 aged 89, in Warsaw) was a Polish theatre, radio and film actor.

References
 Wojciech Brydziński
 Wojciech Brydziński

1877 births
1966 deaths
Actors from Ivano-Frankivsk
People from the Kingdom of Galicia and Lodomeria
Polish Austro-Hungarians
Polish male actors
Burials at Powązki Cemetery
Recipients of the State Award Badge (Poland)